North Western Pirkanmaa  is a subdivision of Pirkanmaa and one of the Sub-regions of Finland since 2009.

Municipalities
 Ikaalinen
 Kihniö
 Parkano

Politics
Results of the 2018 Finnish presidential election:

 Sauli Niinistö   63.4%
 Laura Huhtasaari   10.2%
 Paavo Väyrynen   8.0%
 Matti Vanhanen   6.8%
 Pekka Haavisto   5.5%
 Tuula Haatainen   3.5%
 Merja Kyllönen   2.3%
 Nils Torvalds   0.3%

References

Sub-regions of Finland
Geography of Pirkanmaa